Hatulia B, officially Hatulia B Administrative Post, is an administrative post in Ermera municipality, East Timor. It was separated from Hatulia Administrative Post with effect from 1 January 2022.

References

Administrative posts of East Timor
Ermera Municipality